Bicester Avenue Home and Garden Centre is a shopping centre in Bicester, Oxfordshire, England, that opened in May 2007. Some of the stores at Bicester Avenue include a Blue Diamond (formerly Wyvale) garden centre, World of Water tropical fish shop, Lakeland and Cotswold Outdoor. The large garden centre contains a soft play area for children. Bicester Avenue is located just south of Bicester and south of the much larger outlet centre Bicester Village on the A41 towards Oxford. It is within walking distance of Bicester Village.

References

External links
 Bicester Avenue official website
 

2007 establishments in England
Shopping malls established in 2007
Shopping centres in Oxfordshire
Bicester